Bokshenya Creek is a stream in the U.S. state of Mississippi.

Bokshenya Creek is a name derived from the Choctaw language meaning "crooked/twisted creek".

References

Rivers of Mississippi
Rivers of Attala County, Mississippi
Mississippi placenames of Native American origin